Abbas Ahmad was an Egyptian wrestler. He competed in two events at the 1948 Summer Olympics.

References

External links
 

Year of birth missing
Possibly living people
Egyptian male sport wrestlers
Olympic wrestlers of Egypt
Wrestlers at the 1948 Summer Olympics
Place of birth missing